The 1982 John Player All England Open was the 72nd edition of the All England Open Badminton Championships. It was held in 1982, in Wembley, London. During an International Badminton Federation meeting in London on March 23, 1981 it was agreed to re-elect the twenty members of the breakaway World Badminton Federation. This included China which consequently resulted in some of the world's top players returning to compete in the All England Championships.

Final results

Results

Men's singles

Section 1

Section 2

Women's singles

Section 1

Section 2

Men's doubles

Women's doubles

Mixed doubles

References

All England Open Badminton Championships
All England Open
All England
All England Badminton Championships
All England Badminton Championships
All England Open Badminton Championships in London